Robert or Bob Hodge may refer to:

 Robert Hodge (Australian politician) (1866–1924), Member of the Queensland Legislative Assembly for the Electoral district of Burnett 1909–1912 and Electoral district of Nanango 1912–1920
 Robert Hermon-Hodge, 1st Baron Wyfold (1851–1937), known until 1902 as Robert Hodge, British Conservative MP between 1886 and 1918
 Robert Hodge (American football) (fl. 2002), quarterback for the Colorado Buffaloes football team
 Bob Hodge (linguist) (born 1940), Australian linguist, professor at the University of Western Sydney
 Robert Hodge (Scottish footballer), Scottish footballer
 Robert Leroy Hodge, Multidisciplinary artist